Tacparia detersata, the pale alder moth, is a species of geometrid moth in the family Geometridae. It is found in North America.

References

Further reading

 

Lithinini
Articles created by Qbugbot
Moths described in 1858